Regional elections were held in Scotland on 5 May 1994, as part of the Local Government (Scotland) Act 1973. These were the last elections before 29 new mainland unitary authorities, established by the Local Government etc. (Scotland) Act 1994, came into effect. The councils up for election were last contested in 1990 Scottish regional elections, and vote and seat changes are compared to the 1990 results.

Overview

Background
As these were the last elections to the Regional Councils, which were to be abolished within the next two years, the election was seen as a somewhat pointless exercise as the elected representatives would have minimal time to introduce any policies before powers were transferred to the new unitary authorities. Nevertheless, voters still saw it as an opportunity to demonstrate the popularity of John Major's incumbent Tory Government, which saw the Conservatives lose 21 seats, and be replaced by the Liberal Democrats as third largest party by number of seats.

Outcome
A record number of 1522 candidates stood for election across Scotland, including a new high of 341 women candidates. Turnout stayed almost the same from 1990 at 45.6%, a decrease of 0.3%. The Conservatives' vote share decreased by 5.8%, to give them their worst ever performance at a local election, with only 13.7% of the vote. Labour retained their position as the largest party, down slightly from the previous election. The SNP made large gains  of almost 5%, mainly at the expense of the Conservatives, as did the Liberal Democrats, who increased their vote share by 3.7%. Independent candidates won the most votes in the Highland, Border and Dumfries & Galloway regions, despite having lost up to 9% of the vote in some areas.

Regional Trends
Labour held  Strathclyde, Lothian, Central and Fife Regions, while Independents took a majority on Orkney, Shetland, Highland and the Western Isles councils, as well as taking the most seats on Borders and Dumfries and Galloway councils. As in 1990, no party won a majority on Tayside and Grampian councils, with the SNP overtaking Labour to be the largest party on the former, and the Liberal Democrats winning a plurality of seats on the latter.

National results

|-
!colspan=2|Parties
!votes 
!%
!Seats
|-
| 
||704,604||41.8||220 
|-
| 
||458,951||26.8||73
|-
| 
||234,840||13.7||31
|-
| 
||208,349||12.2||60
|-
| 
||80,092||4.2||65
|-
| 
||4,064|| ||1
|-
| 
||1,839|| ||1
|-
| 
||885|| ||1
|-
| 
||0|| ||1
|-
| 
||11,476||0.7||0
|-
|
|People Pension Power
||313|| ||0
|-
| 
||185|| ||0
|-
| 
||124|| ||0
|-
| 
||97|| ||0
|-
| 
||82|| ||0
|-
|
|James Connolly Society
||76|| ||0
|-
|
|Doctor Slug Party
||43|| ||0
|-
|
|Scottish Republican Socialist
||38|| ||0
|-
|
|Scottish Christian Democratic
||32|| ||0
|-
!colspan=2|Total!!1,706,090!!45.1!!453
|}

Results by council area

Notes

References

1994 Scottish local elections
1994 in Scotland
1994
May 1994 events in the United Kingdom